= Benoît Bastien =

French football referee

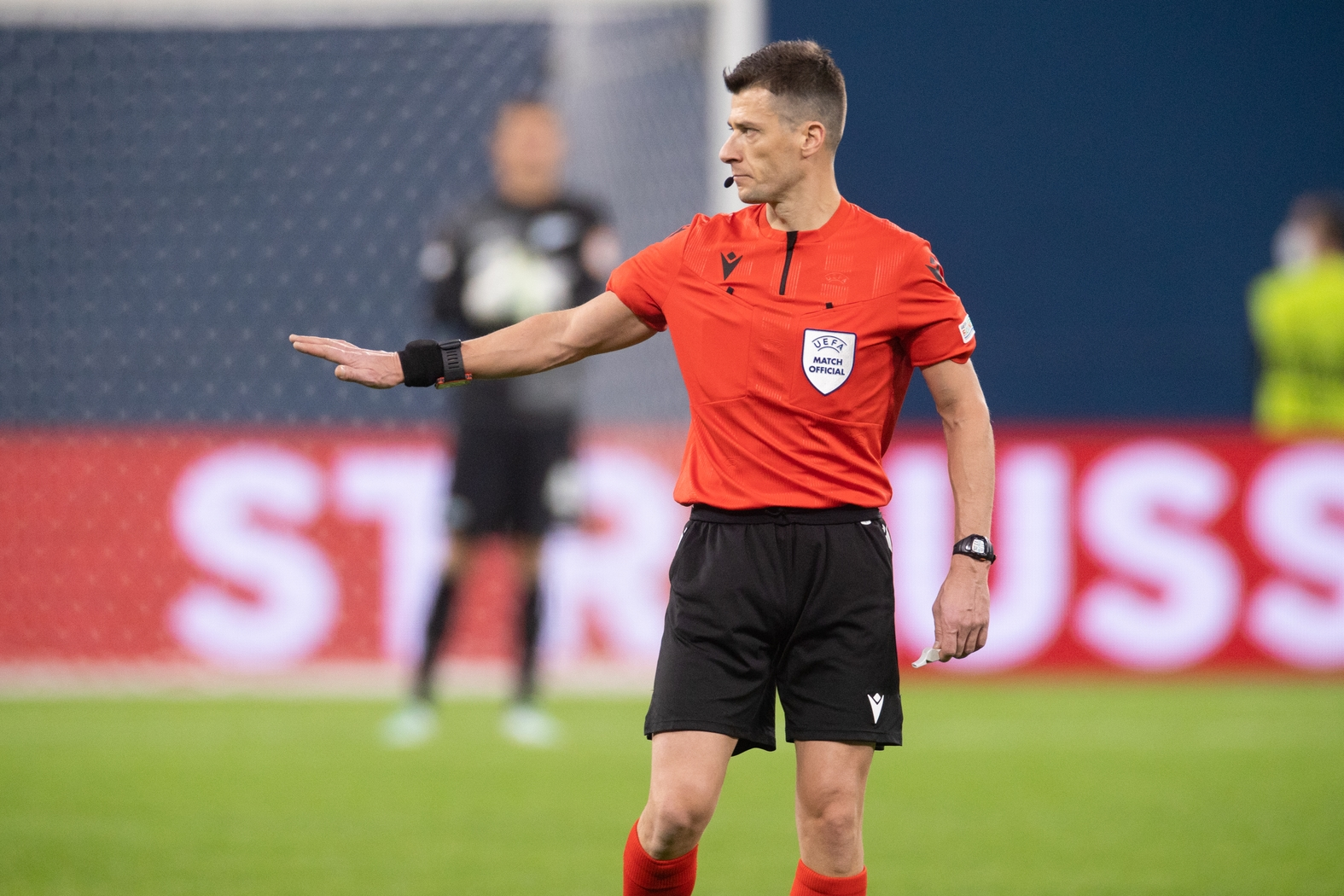
- Born: 17 April 1983 (age 43); Épinal, Vosges, France

Domestic
| Years | League | Role |
| 2011–present | Ligue 1 | Referee |

International
| Years | League | Role |
| 2014–present | FIFA listed | Referee |

Benoît Bastien (born 17 April 1983) is a French professional football referee. He has been a full international for FIFA since 2014.
